Urbona was a genus of moths of the family Nolidae erected by Francis Walker in 1862. It is now considered a synonym of Negeta.

Description
Palpi slender and naked, where the third joint reaching above vertex of head. Antennae with long cilia in male. Thorax and abdomen smoothly scaled, except for a slight tuft on first segment of abdomen. Tibia moderately hairy. Forewings with somewhat rounded apex. Inner margin lobed near base. Retinaculum is bar shaped in male. Hindwings with vein 5 from lower angle of cell.

Species
 Urbona abbreviata (Warren, 1916)
 Urbona albescens (Moore, 1882)
 Urbona chlorocrota (Hampson, 1907)
 Urbona dentilinealis (Moore, 1877)
 Urbona lacteata Hampson, 1910
 Urbona leucophaea (Walker, [1863])
 Urbona nivea (Hampson, 1902)
 Urbona sublineata Walker, 1862
 Urbona tamsi (Eecke, 1924)

References

Chloephorinae